Roger Langley is a ski administrator.

Roger Langley may also refer to:

R. F. Langley, English poet and diarist
Roger Langley of the Langley Baronets